Robert M. Hayes (December 18, 1926 – February 12, 2022) was an American Professor Emeritus and dean of the Graduate School of Library and Information Science (1974–1989), now the Graduate School of Education and Information Studies, at the University of California, Los Angeles (UCLA). An expert on information systems, Hayes began his academic career in mathematics and went on to become a pioneer in the field of information science.

Early life and education
Robert M. Hayes was born on 3 December 1926, in New York City. During his childhood his family moved frequently because of his stepfather's acting career; as a result he attended over sixteen different high schools before receiving his diploma. By that time the United States had entered the Second World War. He was drafted into the Navy, and gained acceptance into the Navy's V-12 program, in the context of which he took courses at the University of Colorado Boulder.

After the War, Hayes completed his B.A. in mathematics at UCLA, in 1946; he went on to earn his M.A. in mathematics there in 1949, and his Ph.D. in 1952.  While completing his Ph.D., he worked in information science at the National Bureau of Standards.

Career
Upon receiving his Ph.D. in 1952, Hayes decided to move into industry, and found a position at Hughes Aircraft, where he programmed a computer to fly an airplane. At that time he also taught in UCLA's university-extension program.  
In 1954, he began working at the National Cash Register Company, and a year later he moved to Magnavox Research Laboratories.  His work at Magnavox was related to important developments in information storage and retrieval, such as the Minicard and the Magnacard systems. Eager to share his knowledge in the field with students, he subsequently went into teaching; in the 1950s to 1960s he held teaching positions at American University, the University of Washington, and the University of Illinois, as well as Wright-Patterson Air Force Base.

In 1958, Hayes was hired as a vice president of Electrada Corporation, where, together with John A. Postley, he created Advanced Information Systems as a subsidiary of Electrada.

At the 1962 Seattle World's Fair ("Century 21 Exposition") Hayes led the training program in library automation for the professional staff of the American Library Association (ALA) exhibit, "Library 21", which aimed to introduce online retrieval to the general public.

He and Joseph Becker co-authored Information Storage and Retrieval (1963), the most comprehensive text in the field at the time. He also partnered with Becker in 1969 to found Becker and Hayes Incorporated, for the purpose of creating an interlibrary network for the State of Washington, a goal that they eventually accomplished.

A lecturer in mathematics at UCLA since 1952, Hayes became a full-time professor there in 1964. Around that time he played a role in the formation of the School of Library Service and the Institute for Library Research.

Hayes was president of the American Society for Information Science and Technology, formerly known as the American Documentation Institute, in 1962/1963, and president  of the Information Science and Automation Division of the ALA (later known as the Library and Information Technology Association, or LITA), in 1969–1970.

At UCLA he served as dean of the Graduate School of Library and Information Science from 1974 to 1989, and became professor emeritus in 1991.

From 1987 through the 2000s, Hayes was a visiting professor at a variety of institutions internationally, including Nankai University, Tianjin, China; the University of Library and Information Science, Tsukuba Science City, Japan; Keio University, Tokyo; Khazar University, Baku, Azerbaijan; the University of New South Wales, Sydney, Australia; Strossmayer University, Osijek, Croatia; Loughborough University, England; and the University of Graz, Austria.

His research as of 2009 focused on the role of libraries in national information economies, and the philosophical foundations of information science.

Publications
Hayes, Robert M. Models for Library Management, Decision-Making, and Planning. San Diego: Academic Press, 2001
Hayes, Robert M. Strategic Management for Academic Libraries. Westport, CO: Greenwood Press, 1993
Hayes, Robert M. Libraries and the Information Economy of California. Los Angeles: UCLA, 1985
Hayes, Robert M. and Becker, Joseph. Handbook of Data Processing for Libraries. New York: Becker and Hayes, 1970 (2nd edition, Wiley, 1974). Winner of Best Information Science Book Award, from ASIS&T, 1971
Becker, Joseph and Hayes, Robert M. Information Storage and Retrieval: Tools, Elements, Theories. New York: John Wiley, 1963

External links
"Robert Hayes, Professor Emeritus", faculty page at UCLA Department of Education & Information Studies
 Transcript of oral history interview with Robert Hayes, conducted by Sarah Buchanan, on August 5, 2010. Los Angeles Chapter of ASIS&T

References

1926 births
2022 deaths
20th-century American mathematicians
Information systems researchers
Writers from New York City
UCLA Graduate School of Education and Information Studies faculty
University of California, Los Angeles alumni
Mathematicians from New York (state)